The String Quartet No. 20 in D major, K. 499, was written in 1786 in Vienna by Wolfgang Amadeus Mozart. It was published by – if not indeed written for – his friend Franz Anton Hoffmeister. Because of this, the quartet has acquired the nickname Hoffmeister. Hoffmeister had started issuing a series of chamber-music publications in 1785, including Mozart's K. 499 as well as Joseph Haydn's Op. 42.

Structure

There are four movements:

This work, sandwiched between the six quartets he dedicated to Joseph Haydn (1782–5) and the following three Prussian Quartets (1789–90), intended to be dedicated to King Frederick William II of Prussia , is often polyphonic in a way uncharacteristic of the earlier part of the classical music era. The menuetto and its trio give good examples of this in brief, with the brief irregular near-canon between first violin and viola in the second half of the main portion of the minuet, and the double imitations  going on in the trio.

See also

 String Quartet in E-flat major (Wanhal) – String Quartet dedicated to Hoffmeister by a contemporary of Mozart.

References
Notes

Sources

External links

Mozart's autograph of the Hoffmeister Quartet (available online)

20
Compositions in D major
1786 compositions